The 1970–71 DDR-Oberliga season was the 23rd season of the DDR-Oberliga, the top level of ice hockey in East Germany. Two teams participated in the league, and SG Dynamo Weißwasser won the championship.

Game results 

Dynamo Weißwasser wins series 9:7 in points

References

External links 
 East German results 1970–1990

DDR-Oberliga (ice hockey) seasons
Ober
Ger
1970 in East German sport
1971 in East German sport